The 2023 TCR South America Touring Car Championship is the third season of TCR South America Touring Car Championship.

Calendar 
The championship is to begin in March 2023, with a maximum of 40 entries, ten rounds consisting of eighteen 35-minute races and two endurance races would be run in Argentina, Brazil and Uruguay. It will also feature two rounds of the TCR World Tour.

Teams and drivers
 
{|
|

Notes

References

External links
 

South America
TCR South America
TCR South America
TCR South America
TCR South America
TCR South America